Phytoecia incallosa is a species of beetle in the family Cerambycidae. It was described by Stephan von Breuning in 1950. It is known from Angola, originally under the genus Blepisanis.

References

Endemic fauna of Angola
Phytoecia
Beetles described in 1950